was a Japanese scholar who specialized in the history of Okinawa. Alongside Iha Fuyū and Higashionna Kanjun, he was considered one of the pioneers of modern Okinawan studies.

Biography 
Majikina entered Okinawa Middle School in 1891, and was a schoolmate of Iha Fuyū. He led a strike and was dismissed from school, later he received pardon and was allowed to return to school. He worked as a journalist after graduation. He became a secretary of Shuri, Okinawa in 1898. In 1924, he was appointed the director of Okinawa Prefectural Library.

His famous works were The history of Okinawan women (1919) and One thousand year history of Okinawa (1923). He also wrote Five great men of Ryukyu Kingdom (1916) together with Iha Fuyū.

References

People from Okinawa Prefecture
Ryukyuan people
1875 births
1933 deaths
20th-century Japanese historians
Historians of Japan